Hachakand-e Tazeh (also Romanized as Hāchehkand-e Tāzeh; also known as Hāchā Kandī) is a village in Ojarud-e Shomali Rural District, in the Central District of Germi County, Ardabil Province, Iran. At the 2006 census, its population was 355, in 64 families.

References 

Towns and villages in Germi County